Vencislav Simeonov (Bulgarian: Венцислав Симеонов, born February 3, 1977, in Plovdiv) is a Bulgarian-Italian volleyball player with a height 200 cm and a weight of 105 kg, playing as opposite-hitter. He was born in Bulgaria. He was a member of the Italian men's national team, that won the silver medal at the 2004 Summer Olympics in Athens, Greece. He played on final of Men's CEV Champions League 2007–08 for Copra Piacenza. He is the son of Kaspar Simeonov.

Career 
1996-1998  Alpitour Cuneo
1998-1999  Caffe Motta Salerno
1999-2000  Della Rovere Carifano
2000-2002  Montichiari
2002-2003  Bre Banca Lannutti Cuneo
2003-2005  Edilbasso & Partners Padova
2005-2008  Copra Berni Piacenza
2008-2012  Tonno Callipo Vibo Valentia
2012-2014  VfB Friedrichshafen
2014-      C.V.M. Tomis Constanța

Historical Standings 
1996 Italian Supercup
1996 European Supercup
1997 Cup Winners Cup
1998 Cup Winners Cup
2000 Italian Cup A2
2002 Italian Supercup
2006 CEV Top Teams Cup
2008 vice champion of CEV Champions League and Italian Volleyball League

State awards
 2004  Officer's Order of Merit of the Italian Republic

References
CONI Profile

1977 births
Living people
Bulgarian men's volleyball players
Italian men's volleyball players
Olympic volleyball players of Italy
Olympic silver medalists for Italy
Volleyball players at the 2004 Summer Olympics
Olympic medalists in volleyball
Medalists at the 2004 Summer Olympics
Bulgarian emigrants to Italy
Expatriate volleyball players in Romania
Italian expatriate sportspeople in Romania
Sportspeople from Plovdiv
Expatriate volleyball players in Germany
Italian expatriate sportspeople in Germany
Italian volleyball coaches
Recipients of the Order of Merit of the Italian Republic
Bulgarian volleyball coaches
Bulgarian expatriate sportspeople in Romania
Bulgarian expatriate sportspeople in Germany